The MDNA Tour was the ninth concert tour by American singer Madonna, launched in support of her twelfth studio album, MDNA (2012). Comprising 88 shows, the tour began on May 31, 2012, in Tel Aviv's Ramat Gan Stadium and concluded in Córdoba, Argentina on December 22, 2012. Rumors of the singer embarking on a concert tour first began in October 2011, but nothing was confirmed until four months later, following Madonna's performance at the Super Bowl XLVI halftime show. Madonna's fifth tour with Live Nation, it visited Eurasia and the Americas, and marked the first time she visited the United Arab Emirates, Ukraine, Scotland and Colombia. Additionally, it was her first visit to Turkey since the Girlie Show (1993). An Australian leg was planned for January 2013 but was cancelled.

Described as "the journey of a soul from darkness to light", it was divided into thematic sections, a custom for the singer: Transgression, Prophecy, Masculine/Feminine, and Redemption. Designers working on the tour's wardrobe included Arianne Phillips and Jean Paul Gaultier. It received generally positive reviews from critics, who praised the production and performances. The lack of the singer's old songs and inclusion of MDNA tracks, however, received criticism. The tour sparked several controversies due to the use of firearms, violence, nudity, and Madonna's political statements. French far right politician Marine Le Pen filed a lawsuit against the singer because a video used for one performance compared Le Pen to Adolf Hitler. Also in France, one concert offered at Pariss Olympia venue was trashed by fans for its short length. In Russia, Madonna received backlash for openly supporting feminist punk-rock band Pussy Riot and challenging the country's so-called anti-gay law.

MDNA was a commercial success; with $305.2 million from 88 sold-out shows, it was named the most lucrative tour of 2012 and became the tenth highest-grossing of all time. Madonna was awarded Top Touring Artist at the 2013 Billboard Music Awards. The concerts offered at Miami's American Airlines Arena were filmed and broadcast as Madonna: The MDNA Tour through EPIX. A live album titled MDNA World Tour was released on September 10, 2013, in all formats: double-disc album, DVD, and Blu-ray.

Background 

In October 2011, fansite DrownedMadonna released a supposed 2012 tour itinerary from Live Nation with dates in Auckland, Singapore, Thailand, China, South Korea, Japan, Abu Dhabi and Tel Aviv. Madonna's publicist Liz Rosenberg later confirmed this to be false. A month later, Madonna partnered with Smirnoff to produce a global dance contest called the "Smirnoff Nightlife Exchange Project", where she, along with her choreographers and manager Guy Oseary, judged dancers at New York's Roseland Ballroom; the winner would get to join her on a then-unnamed concert tour. The winner of the contest was Charles "Lil Buck" Riley, who was chosen from eleven finalists.

On February 5, 2012, Madonna performed at the Super Bowl XLVI halftime show at Lucas Oil Stadium in Indianapolis, Indiana. Two days later, dates for the tour were officially announced. Live Nation executive Arthur Fogel reported that it would be Madonna's most extensive tour ever in terms of number of concerts. Set to play 26 European markets before moving on to North and South America, the tour would conclude in Australia in early 2013; it would be the singer's first tour of Australia since The Girlie Show, twenty years earlier. Venues would include arenas, stadiums, and "unique outdoor sights" such as Quebec's Plains of Abraham. Madonna's twelfth studio album, MDNA, was released on March 26. With every ticket purchased online, US residents received their choice of a digital or physical copy of MDNA; according to Fogel, around 30 percent of ticket buyers had signed up for a free copy of the album. The Wall Street Journal reported that 200,000 to 250,000 copies of the album were given away with concert tickets.

On July 18, it was reported that the Australian leg had been cancelled; a spokesperson stated that "Madonna's tour will end in South America in December as planned. That's all we can say". This was met with backlash from Australian fans, who voiced their anger online. The singer then posted an audio message on YouTube apologizing to her fans; she explained that "my children are my first priority", describing the difficulty of balancing her jobs as a singer and mother. "Please forgive me and know that when I do come to Australia, I will have made the wait worth your while and I will put on the greatest show on Earth. I haven’t forgotten about you", the audio concluded.

Development

Conception and rehearsals 

The MDNA Tour was Madonna's fifth tour with Live Nation; it was first discussed in the summer of 2010 after architect Mark Fisher had several conversations with Guy Oseary and Arthur Fogel. Jake Berry, who had worked on U2's 360° Tour, joined the conversations early on and the financial and logistical framework was set by the end of the year. This period of time was referred to by Fogel as an "established window"; Fogel also noted that Madonna's tours had become a "cultural touch point", that remain a "unique animal" in terms of "striking a chord" with fans and generating media coverage. During a Facebook chat with Jimmy Fallon, Madonna confirmed that she would not repeat any performance from the Super Bowl on tour, which she described as "[the] journey of a soul from darkness to light [...] part cinematic musical theatre. [...] Part spectacle and sometimes intimate Performance art". She also explained that the concert would be divided into different thematic acts ―a custom for her tours― and that the first act would be titled Transgression. She further revealed the show would include "a lot of violence". The four acts were later revealed to be Transgression, Prophecy, Masculine/Feminine, and Redemption. Jamie King was appointed creative director, while the rest of the personnel included backup singers Kiley Dean and Nicki Richards, Monte Pittman on guitar and more than 15 dancers, including Lil Buck. Madonna asked Slackliner Andy Lewis to be part of the tour but he turned the offer down. Basque band Kalakan, whom the singer discovered while vacationing in Guéthary, was hired to perform on a re-worked version of "Open Your Heart".

Rehearsals for the pre-production phase took place in an unused warehouse in Manhattan that was transformed into a studio with a mock-stage; on May 27, 2012, the troupe moved to the real stage at the Nassau Veterans Memorial Coliseum for full-on production rehearsals. Describing the rehearsals as "brutal" and "violent", Madonna posted pictures of herself covered in bruises on Facebook. As rehearsals moved to location in Ramat Gan Stadium, more pictures from rehearsals were released online; video footage confirmed songs like "Celebration" and "Express Yourself", which was mashed up with Lady Gaga's 2011 single "Born This Way". A number of fake set lists for the tour circulated on the internet, with MTV finally revealing the official list on May 14. The MDNA Tour officially began in Tel Aviv on May 31, 2012, and ended on Córdoba, Argentina, on December 22. Of why she chose to kick off in Israel, Madonna said: "I chose to start my world tour [in Israel] for a very specific and important reason [...] the Middle East and all the conflicts that have been occurring here for thousands of years – they have to stop".

Stage and costume design 
Stageco developed, manufactured and supplied the stage for the MDNA Tour. The stage counted with several lifts that were positioned throughout so that props and dancers could be brought up at specific moments. Overhead, there were two heavy duty tracks used to move people and scenery. Additionally, it was six stories high so that members of the audience sitting far away would still be able to see Madonna. An inflatable, custom-built roof structure was used to cover the stage on outdoor concerts; it was provided by Buitink Technology in collaboration with European Future Structures NV. With a surface of approximately 1.100 m2, it consisted of 11 separate cushions filled with air. The singer opted for an inflatable roof for two reasons: simplicity of erection and protection against the weather.

The backdrop of the stage was made from eight tracking and rotating video screens, which were described as being the largest ever built for a concert. When retracted, the cube surfaces were precisely alined with the floor in order to create a flat surface. Props for the show included a thurible, a large confessional, a moving motel room, fake guns including a Kalashnikov rifle and Uzis, large chandeliers, kinetic mirrors and a rustic multi-layered riser, from where Kalakan performed. It took four planes to ferry the tour across countries.

Designers working on the tour's wardrobe included Arianne Phillips, Jean Paul Gaultier, Jeremy Scott and Alexander Wang. Dolce & Gabbana created the outfits worn by the band and background vocalists; 700 shoes were provided by Prada, Miu Miu and Madonna's own brand Truth or Dare. Costumes created by Phillips included a Joan of Arc-inspired getup fashioned from metal mesh and Swarovski crystals, and a 1940s-inspired "playful and fun" majorette uniform. Phillips recalled that "one of the greatest things about Madonna is that she's so prolific [...] Whether it's her attention to detail as a director or her own work as a performer on a tour, [...] it's the same attention to detail". Jean Paul Gaultier created the look for the performance of "Vogue", consisting of white shirt, black tie, opera-length black gloves and a rigid skeleton conical corset; the corset was a nod to the one worn by the singer on her Blond Ambition World Tour (1990), "but reinterpreted in 3-D, in patent leather on the outside with metallic leather on the inside", according to the designer. Hervé Leger by Max Azria provided a custom-made harness; additional articles of clothing included lingerie provided by Truth or Dare, bandolier vests and rams head masks created by Fausto Puglisi, and custom-made jeans by J Brand. The singer made eight costume changes throughout the concert.

Multimedia and video 

Madonna recruited the services of Canadian multimedia company Moment Factory to create the tour's visuals; it was the second time the singer had worked with this company, following the Super Bowl XLVI halftime show. The team had four months to develop concepts, create designs and produce multimedia content for 12 songs, including "Papa Don't Preach", "Express Yourself", "Vogue", "I'm a Sinner", "Like a Prayer" and "Celebration". The process required full 2D and 3D animation production, with video shoots taking place in India, New York and Montreal. According to Johanna Marsal, content creator for Moment Factory, after being assigned the songs, they would brainstorm a main idea for each one with show director Michael Laprise, video technical director Stefaan Desmedt and choreographers Rich + Tone; they then would develop mood boards and concept boards that Madonna had to approve. The ideas and concepts they came up with for the visuals were influenced by what Madonna and the dancers would wear onstage, along with thinking about how the live audience would see the concert. Marsal recalled that the singer would sometimes "have certain words from songs" and the team's work would be to develop a concept with said idea. They also were given "a lot of flexibility and freedom" and would touch base with the lighting and set designers.

The opening act, "Girl Gone Wild", took place in a "photo realistic church", for which the team of Moment Factory created a matte painting of an ornate 3D cathedral. Shooting for the visuals used for the track "Gang Bang", which showed blood being spattered, lasted three days and took place in Montreal. For the performance of "I'm a Sinner", the singer wanted to capture a "psychedelic journey", thus Moment Factory travelled to India and filmed from the back of a train. Finally, visuals for "Celebration" were described as a "full-blown spectacle of color and movement". Tom Munro and Johan Söderberg created a video that morphed Madonna's face with a number of famous figures, including then-Chinese President Hu Jintao, US Republican former vice presidential candidate Sarah Palin and Pope Benedict XVI. Used for the song "Nobody Knows Me", the singer explained the video was about "intolerance that we human beings have for one another. And how much we judge people before knowing them". Munro also created a video of Madonna hiding from a gang of masked clowns in a luxurious hotel room, projected on the number "Justify My Love". For the "Express Yourself"/"Born This Way" mashup, Madonna used imagery of
Roy Lichenstein and a video of monsters swallowing cans emblazoned with images of the corset and ponytail from her Blond Ambition World Tour and David Bowie's Aladdin Sane lightning bolt; this was seen as Madonna taking a "deliberate shot" at Gaga by Slants Sal Cinquemani, as "monsters" is how Gaga refers to her fanbase. The logo for the magazine of the same name flashed on screens during the performance of "Vogue". Videos of Lil Wayne, Nicki Minaj and M.I.A. were used on the performances of "Revolver", "I Don't Give A", and "Give Me All Your Luvin'", respectively.

According to Stefaan Desmedt, one of the biggest challenges was mapping the videos on the cube lifts. For this, he worked with a DR controller made by UVA with features that were custom configured to project visuals on the screens. Desmedt recalled that working on Madonna's show was very different to other concerts "because it’s very theatrical [...] Whereas usually, you’d be cutting to the music, here you’re cutting to very tiny details. It’s less flexible".

Concert synopsis 

The show was divided into four sections: Transgression, Prophecy, Masculine/Feminine, and Redemption. It began with a cathedral setting, with the Kalakan trio doing religious chanting and pushing the thurible. The chants eventually morph into chants of Madonna's name, as the two main backdrop screens split open to reveal the confessional covered by scrim at the front and with the singer inside. As "Girl Gone Wild" began, she pretended to smash and break through the glass window of the confessional with a large rifle and proceeded to perform the song accompanied by a troupe of shirtless dancers wearing high heels, doing a choreography similar to the song's music video. The show continued with "Revolver", which saw the singer and the female dancers holding automatic rifles and Lil' Wayne on the screens. "Gang Bang" followed; performed in the moving motel room, Madonna shot dancers dangling from above the stage as blood splashed the backdrops. A shortened "Papa Don't Preach" is sung on the tip of the stage's triangle-shaped end. Then, dancers dressed in army pants and animal masks surrounded and tied the singer up, giving way to "Hung Up". This number had her slacklining while dancers slid under the ropes. Madonna closed the first section performing "I Don't Give A" on guitar while Nicki Minaj appeared on the backdrops sitting on a throne. The first video interlude featured various tombstones and a man walking through a cemetery; set to a mashup of MDNA track "Best Friend", and "Heartbeat" from Hard Candy (2008), it had contortionist dancers performing in gas masks.

"Express Yourself" opened the Prophecy segment; Madonna and her dancers were decked out as majorettes and did a choreography with a baton. Halfway through, she sang a snippet of Lady Gaga's "Born This Way" and her own "She's Not Me" from Hard Candy. The next number, "Give Me All Your Luvin'", had a drumline suspended in mid-air and Minaj and M.I.A. on the screens. Afterwards, a video interlude called "Turning Up the Hits" started, where excerpts of "Holiday", "Into the Groove", "Lucky Star", "Like a Virgin", "4 Minutes", "Ray of Light" and "Music" were played; this led to "Turn Up the Radio", with the singer in a black leather dress and playing guitar. A reworked "Open Your Heart" and Basque song "Sagarra Jo!" were sung by Madonna and the Kalakan trio. "Masterpiece" closed the act, as scenes from W.E. played on the backdrops. A remixed interlude of "Justify My Love" began the Masculine/Feminine act; the black-and-white video showed Madonna running away from masked dancers and locking herself inside a room. "Vogue" saw her wearing the re-worked Gaultier conical corset while the dancers wore black-and-white avant-garde outfits. Madonna lost the corset for the mashup of "Candy Shop" and "Erotica", performed in a French cabaret setting. The next number is "Human Nature", where the singer removed her clothes as mirrors were moved around the stage. A slow "Like a Virgin" closed the act; it was performed with a pianist who played "Evgeni's Waltz" from W.E and a shirtless dancer, who put a corset on Madonna and pulled the strings.

The "Nobody Knows Me" video interlude opened the final segment, Redemption; it morphed Madonna's face with a number of famous public figures. The Shaolin-themed "I'm Addicted" found Madonna in the Phillips-designed Joan of Arc outfit. The following number, "I'm a Sinner", featured Madonna on guitar wearing a Lei while the backdrops featured a train traveling through India; elements of her unreleased 2000 song "Cyber-Raga" were added to the performance. The final numbers were "Like a Prayer" and "Celebration"; the former found the singer and dancers dressed in robes as images of churches and Hebrew writings flashed onscreen, while the latter had the troupe wearing Beats by Dre and mimicking DJ moves, with colored 3D cubes in the backdrops and laser lights illuminating the stage.

Critical reception

Asia and Europe 
In his review of the opening night performance in Tel Aviv, The Jerusalem Posts Niv Elis described the show as an "assault on the senses", further writing: "say what you will about the Kabbalah-studying, gun-toting, fashionista of pop music – and everyone has something to say – but the woman knows how to put on a good show". From The National, Saeed Saeed praised the "visually dazzling" concert, but noted that "while her previous Sticky and Sweet tour saw her lightly poking fun at herself and her various musical guises [...] [MDNA] was at times brutally dark and suffocating and as much an emotional exorcism as a performance". Marie Louise-Olson, from the same publication, noted Madonna was "bursting with energy and looking fit as ever". Peter E. Muller, from German newspaper Berliner Morgenpost, referred to the concert as an "elaborate stage spectacle of enigmatic force" and said that "Madonna live in 2012 is still magical and unmatched". Ingo Schmidt from WDR 2 applauded the "provocative and sexy" show, noting that the singer still "dominates even after 30 years on stage". Neil McCormick from The Daily Telegraph classified the MDNA Tour as "a typically sensationalist and schizophrenic Madonna production, mixing sex, ultra violence, religion, kitsch and politics to bizarre but entertaining effect". From the Birmingham Mail, Kat Keogh wrote that "the pure theatre of [Madonna's] performance was enough to sustain the 11,000 strong audience". Luis Hidalgo, on his review of the Barcelona concert for Spanish newspaper El País, opined that "Madonna shows her intelligence, femininity and elegance in a danceable and spectacular show". According to Beverley Lyons from the Daily Record, the "remarkable" MDNA concert showed a "softer side to the Queen of Pop" and proved she was "still in Vogue with fans".

The performances were also praised; Schmidt highlighted the finale of "Like a Prayer" and "Celebration", the former for sounding "as thrillingly as in the original '89 video", and the latter for "taking advantage of the XXL dance floor". Nonetheless, he criticized the performance of "Like a Virgin" for being "difficult to recognize". By contrast, Neil McCormick from The Daily Telegraph deemed "Like a Virgin" the "real highlight" of the night. Hidalgo singled out "Open Your Heart" and "Masterpiece", as both numbers featured Basque trio Kalakan. From The Scotsman, Gary Flockhart praised the performance of "Express Yourself" for having "lightened" the mood after the opening Transgression act; he also singled out "Open Your Heart", "Vogue", and "Like a Prayer", concluding that, although "it would have been great to hear a few more of the singer’s vintage hits [...] [she's] still a class act". Elis singled out the rendition of "lukewarm single" "Give Me All Your Luvin'" as one of the show's "wow" moments; he also praised the mashup of "Candy Shop" and "Erotica", which he felt "showcase[d] Madonna at her visual best".

The staff from Blick pointed out that "[Madonna] offered a show that was rehearsed down to the last detail with little spontaneity". On his review of the London concert, the Evening Standards John Aizlewood criticized the lack of Madonna's classic songs; "disappointingly, she dipped into one of popular music's great back catalogues occasionally and begrudgingly", the author wrote. Vogue Italias Giulia Blasi qualified the show as "huge, spectacular, often slightly tacky, obviously expensive" and blamed "the poor quality of the sound for anyone not standing directly in front of the stage", noting "suspiciously pristine vocals in the middle of very choreography-heavy songs". Simon Price writing for The Independent, said that "for a woman who sings – or mimes – about sex, she's always made it seem like cold, hard work, all Pilates and no passion", concluding that "[MDNA] goes off with a whimper, not a bang". Natalie Shaw, from The Arts Desk, opined that "'The MDNA Tour' finds Madge disastrously sapping the joy out of even her most triumphant choruses". More negative criticism came from musicOMHs Michael Hubbard, who noted that "the vocals are unremarkable at best and auto-tuned to oblivion at worst", calling it "a gig that lacked oomph throughout". In their 2014 book Ageing, Popular Culture and Contemporary Feminism: Harleys and Hormones, Imelda Whelehan and Joel Gwynne noted that there were "far more reviews of Madonna's MDNA tour than there are reviews of the other bands, and this global tour was often (inexplicably) reviewed in the UK press even when the actual performances took place much further afield".

North America 
Rolling Stones Colleen Nika deemed the concert "ambitious" and applauded Madonna for having "moved on from parading as a rock star", concluding that "no one does provocative pop better, and no one, even now, looks cooler doing it". Jon Pareles from The New York Times felt MDNA was a "display of energy and nutty inventiveness", adding that it's "less a story than an excellent excuse for extravagant, perpetually surprising production numbers [...] while it turns some of Madonna’s past hits inside out". Glenn Gamboa from Newsday wrote that "[Madonna's] latest reinvention might be her most revealing yet" because "her wild, nearly two-hour show is closest to reflecting her current state of mind, while building yet another artistic, well-choreographed slacklining spectacle". Writing for The Seattle Times, Sharon Pian Chan wrote that "there is only one word to say after Madonna's extravaganza, spectacle and concert Tuesday night: Respect"; from the same publication, Andrew Matson described the show as "two hours of hits from a remarkable career, with high-budget sets and intricate choreography". On his review of the show in Montreal, Marc-André Lemieux from Le Journal de Montréal hailed the concert "sometimes dark, sometimes bright, but always entertaining and provocative". Mark Segal Kemp from Creative Loafing opined that "'The MDNA Tour' is not a concert – it's a theater event, complete with concepts and routines that range from well-thought-out to somewhat abstruse". For Aidin Vaziri from the San Francisco Chronicle, it was a "masterfully produced and all-around beautiful concert". The concerts in Medellín were deemed "historic" and "unprecedented" by Colombian press.

From Las Vegas Review-Journal, Jason Bracelin noted that "fresh off a bitter divorce, with a new album that's among her most unguarded, [Madonna] has seldom seemed so human or humane"; Bracelin also highlighted "the way in which Madonna continually reconfigured past hits into something new". The "professional rivalry" exhibited when Madonna incorporated Lady Gaga's "Born This Way" on "Express Yourself" was singled out by Jon Pareles.  The inclusion of MDNA tracks received a mixed reception. For Ross Raihala from the St. Paul Pioneer Press, the "major complaint" were the album cuts, some of which don't "stand up to her big hits", also critiquing the "not-always-successful arrangements" of Madonna's old songs. By contrast, Segal Kemp expressed that "if you come to a Madonna show expecting just hits, you'll be as disappointed as a casual Bob Dylan fan who expects his concerts to include faithful versions of 'Blowin' in the Wind' or 'Mr. Tambourine Man' [...] her non-hit material is every bit as adventurous and challenging as any of her hits. More so, in many cases". Similarly, Lemieux applauded Madonna for "thinking outside the box", praising the performances of "I Don't Give A" and "Turn Up the Radio", which he felt were given an "extra punch" through the electric guitar. Ben Crandell, from the Sun-Sentinel, highlighted "Express Yourself", "Open Your Heart", the "stylish" "Vogue", and "Like a Virgin".

Slants Sal Cinquemani considered the third segment, Masculine/Femenine, to be the show's "creative climax", but criticized the shortened "Papa Don't Preach" and the rendition of "Hung Up". Vaziri declared that "the spectacle was great, but the set list was terrible". Despite naming it "brilliantly choreographed and impeccably executed", Spins Carolyn Ganz considered MDNA to be the singer's "least coherent" concert since 2001's Drowned World Tour. On the same vein, Bracelin wrote that "there was so much going on, both in song and onstage, that the show felt a little muddled in places, like someone trying to force together pieces of a puzzle that don't fit". A negative review came from The Mercury News Jim Harrington: "The set list was weak. The new songs were forgettable. The old favorites were dressed up in different arrangements, most of which were awful. And the theatrics — such a big part of a Madonna concert — ranged from dreadful to dull". On 2015, MDNA was named Madonna's seventh best concert tour by both The Advocates Gina Vivinetto and VH1's Christopher Rosa; the latter wrote: "[Madonna] spared no expense to let us know she was angry. [...] After the original shock of 'WHAT THE HELL IS HAPPENING?!' wears off, the MDNA Tour is actually a very solid concert that harkens to Madonna's earlier themes of sex, religion and playing the shock factor for all its worth". Six years later, Odyssey's Rocco Papa placed it in the sixth position of his ranking, praising the singer for "referencing her past incarnations while still offering something fresh".

Commercial reception 

Tickets for the MDNA Tour went on sale following the singer's appearance at the Super Bowl. Members of Icon, Madonna's official fan club, received first access to tickets and VIP Packages. They were also given access to a tour devoted forum and exclusive merchandise. US prices ranged from $45 to more than $350, with some premium packages costing about $600. This received some criticism, to which the singer replied: "people spend $300 on crazy things all the time, things like handbags. So work all year, scrape the money together, and come to my show. I'm worth it". According to Digital Spys Zeba Blay, shows had sold out "in seconds" in places such as Istanbul, Montreal, Ottawa, Minnesota, Houston, Dallas, Phoenix, and Los Angeles. On April 19, Billboard reported than more than 1.4 million tickets had already been sold, grossing about $214 million; Live Nation's Arthur Fogel said MDNA was "completely on track to end up in the top 10 tours of all time". Madonna's first ever show in Abu Dhabi had fans lined up in front of the Virgin Megastore since 7 a.m. (GST), according to local newspaper The National; all 22,000 tickets were sold out within hours of their launch, prompting organizers to add a second date. 50,000 in Istanbul sold out in just four days. German news agency Deutsche Presse-Agentur reported that entrances for both shows in Berlin had sold out only in few hours after going on sale. Tickets for the first Amsterdam concert were sold out in just thirty minutes.

The MDNA Tour was commercially successful in the United States as well. 60,000 tickets for the first concert at New York's Yankee Stadium were reported to have sold out in just 20 minutes, leading to a second date.  Tickets for the concert in Kansas City, around 14,000, sold out in 12 minutes; in Houston, entrances sold out in less than an hour, which caused a second date to be added. In Montreal, 16,000 tickets were sold in 20 minutes; the single concert at Quebec's Plains of Abraham sold 65,000 tickets in just an hour. Madonna sold out 15,000 tickets for the show in Ottawa's Scotiabank Palace in 21 minutes, becoming the fastest-selling concert in the arena's 16-year history and breaking a record previously held by AC/DC. The "most expensive" tickets for the first concert in Mexico City sold out within two hours and fifteen minutes during the pre-sales; 6,500 tickets were sold at a record-breaking five minutes during the pre-sale for the second Mexican concert. According to RCN Radio, there was a "massive demand" for tickets for the singer's first concert in Medellín; 38,000 entrances quickly sold out during the pre-sale, while the remaining 2,000 tickets ran out in three hours. More than 100,000 ticket sold out within two days in Brazil. Digital Spy then reported that MDNA had outsold Lady Gaga's Born This Way Ball in South America despite tickets for the former being three times as expensive as those for the latter.

After completion, MDNA became the tenth highest-grossing tour of all time, grossing $305.2 million from 88 sold-out shows; it also became the second highest-grossing for a female artist behind Madonna's own Sticky & Sweet Tour. Billboard named it the most lucrative tour of 2012, making it Madonna's third time closing a year at the top of the box office heap, the others being 2009 and 2004. The artist also joined the Rolling Stones, the Grateful Dead and Bon Jovi as the only acts to be Billboards highest-grossing tour twice in a three-year span. Madonna was awarded Top Touring Artist at the 2013 Billboard Music Awards.

Controversies

Political 

The video interlude of the song "Nobody Knows Me" received strong criticism from the French far right, as it showed politician Marine Le Pen  with a swastika superimposed on her forehead, before her face morphed into that of Adolf Hitler. Le Pen responded by accusing the singer of stealing ―and later buying― her adopted African children; she then referred to Madonna as an "aging singer" who "need[s] publicity go to such extremes" because "her songs don't work anymore". Le Pen also threatened to sue the singer if she kept the video unchanged for the Paris and Nice stops of the tour. "If she does that in France, we'll be waiting for her", she told Le Parisien. During the Paris concert, on July 14, the video performance remained unaltered, prompting the National Front to sue the singer for "public insult". Florian Philippot, then-Vice President of the National Front, considered it a "very serious insult", accusing Madonna of "trying to get more people to her concerts", while Najat Vallaud-Belkacem, from the Socialist Party, found the incident "regrettable". Jean-Marie Le Pen recommended his daughter "ask Madame Madonna — and everyone who organized her international show — for $1 million". French anti-racism group SOS Racisme, however, expressed their support for the singer, calling the video a "resolutely anti-racist and feminist" statement. Madonna tied to quell the controversy, saying she wasn't trying "to make enemies" but to "promote tolerance". According to The Hollywood Reporter, the controversy affected ticket sales in France, with 4,400 tickets for the Nice show being given away for free. During the concert in Nice, the swastika from the video was removed and replaced with a question mark; this was applauded by Gael Nofri, spokesperson for Le Pen, who expressed that "to my knowledge, Madonna has never changed a video before [...] It's proof that our arguments won out. It's excellent news".

During the Washington, D.C. concert, Madonna openly supported the re-election of then-president Barack Obama, whom she referred to as a "black Muslim". The singer later clarified her comments, saying that she was being ironic; "yes, I know Obama is not a Muslim – though I know that plenty of people in this country think he is. And what if he were?". In Louisiana, when Madonna expressed her support for Obama, she was both cheered and booed by the audience; she tried to rectify the situation by saying: "I don't care who you vote for.  Do not take this great privilege for granted". In her Los Angeles show, Madonna dedicated the song "Human Nature" to Malala Yousafzai, a 14-year-old Pakistani girl who was shot by members of the Taliban for speaking out on her right to have an education; "this made me cry. The 14-year-old Pakistani girl who was shot on a school bus for writing a blog [...] Do you understand the sickness and absurdity of this? [...] Support education! Support the people who support women!", the singer told the audience. Later on, she revealed the word "Malala" painted on her back. News of this spread to Pakistan, where some took to Twitter to voice disapproval of Madonna's gesture.

Firearms and nudity 

The use of firearms in the performances of "Revolver" and "Gang Bang" was met with backlash. In Scotland, Madonna defied a local ban that prevented her from brandishing fake weaponry on stage; the warnings came just 36 hours before the Colorado theater shooting. While on the concert, the singer joked about the ban and told the audience: "due to your laws here they might pull the plug on me so if they cut us off suddenly, write to your local MP". A spokesman for Mothers Against Guns felt the performances were "in bad taste, but given what happened in Colorado it is even worse. She should know better". The use of weaponry did not go unnoticed in the Denver concert; Mile High Sports personality Peter Burns said he was "taken aback" by the use of guns; "you could see people kinda looking at each other [...] I heard the word 'Colorado' you know, 'Aurora', 'Shooting' [...] [it was] a little bit unsettling. I saw two or three people get up and grab their stuff and actually leave their seats".  Liz Rosenberg told the HuffPost that "[Madonna] would rather cancel her show than censor her art. Her entire career, she has fought against people telling her what she can and cannot do. She's not about to start listening to them now". Madonna commented on the controversy in an interview for Good Morning America, saying that she would not alter the performances, adding: "that would be like asking people to not have guns in action movies... I mean, the thing is, guns don't kill people, people kill people. That whole first section of the show is like an action movie, and I was playing a super-vixen who wanted revenge". She further added in a letter to Billboard:
"I do not condone violence or the use of guns [...] they are symbols of wanting to appear strong and wanting to find a way to stop feelings that I find hurtful or damaging. In my case I want to stop the lies and hypocrisy of the church, the intolerance of many narrow minded cultures and societies I have experienced throughout my life and in some cases the pain I have felt from having my heart broken".
Despite the controversy, critical reception towards this segment was mixed; Neil McCormick considered it "quite unpleasantly aggressive", but noted that "its hard to deny that aggression suits [Madonna]"; for Gary Flockhart, it was "exhilarating to watch, if in bad taste". Andrew Matson opined that the act's violence was "so over the top, it overshadowed the rest of the show". Mark Segal Kemp said it was one of the moments that saw a few audience members get up from their seats and leave the venue; similarly, Ross Raihala wrote that "darkness hung over much of the first half of the show". Marc-André Lemieux gave a positive review, and said that  "the aggressiveness [shown by Madonna] was nothing wrong. On the contrary. We felt that she was invested, passionate and even possessed".

The "Human Nature" number was also met with controversy, as it had the singer doing a striptease. While performing in Turkey, the singer briefly pulled down her bra and briefly flashed her nipple; in Rome, she mooned the audience. Andy Cohen said the singer's bare breasts were "old news"; writing for India Today, Deepti Jakhar felt Madonna came across "a bit desperate to regain her controversial stage presence", and compared the antic to Janet Jackson's 2004 Super Bowl incident. Of the singer flashing herself in Rome, Entertainment Weeklys Annie Barrett questioned her authenticity and said it was "as fake as House Hunters". BuzzFeed's Amy Odell defended the singer in an article titled "Leave Madonna's 53-year-old breast alone"; "apparently now when that inevitable thing called aging happens, [women] have to worry about covering up enough so that we don't look 'desperate' [...] Heavens! Women who are 53 still have breasts and... sex drives!", Odell wrote.

Paris's Olympia concert 

On July 17, it was announced the singer would do an "intimate one night only performance" at Pariss Olympia hall, on Thursday July 26. It was described as Madonna's way "to honor her love for French artists, French cinema and a tribute to France’s long history of welcoming and inspiring artists". Tickets for the concert were first allotted to members of her official fan club on July 18, and three days later, were put on sale for the general public; entrances were limited to two per person. Due to an "overwhelming demand for tickets", the show was streamed live through LoveLive's YouTube channel; Toby L, creative director of LoveLive commented: "We are beyond elated to be hosting a global stream of one of the world's most iconic artists in such a unique and intimate circumstance [...] This performance typifies what we're doing with the LoveLive music series, which will continue to feature the world's most recognizable music artists". Songs performed on this date included a mashup of Madonna's 2002 single "Die Another Day" and MDNA album track "Beautiful Killer", as well as a cover of Serge Gainsbourg's "Je t'aime... moi non plus" (1969).

The concert was critically panned by fans and attendees, many of whom had allegedly paid more than €280 or had slept on the street overnight to be able to purchase tickets, with most of the criticism centering on the fact that the set only lasted 45 minutes. After the show was over and the singer left the stage, people started booing and yelling insults like salope, the French word for "slut"; a crowd then gathered in the streets in front of the venue demanding a refund. Fans also took to social media to express their disappointment; the video of the concert uploaded to YouTube had received more than 12,000 dislikes by the next day. The singer's political talk was also criticized. Following the backlash, publicist Liz Rosenberg issued a statement saying that "[the show] was not billed as her full MDNA concert and tremendous effort was made to keep the ticket prices reasonable [...] [it] cost Madonna close to a million dollars to produce. She has done a handful of club dates in the past and they were never more than 45 minutes". The singer herself addressed the controversy:
"Playing the Olympia was a magical moment for me and it was real treat to do this special show for my fans and be so close to them. Unfortunately at the end of the show – after I left the stage – a few thugs who were not my fans rushed the stage and started throwing plastic bottles pretending to be angry fans. The press reports have focused on this and not the joyous aspect of the evening. But nothing can take away or ruin this very special evening for me and my fans. When I looked out in the audience, everyone I saw had a smile on their face. I look forward to having this wonderful experience again".

Pussy Riot and LGBT rights in Russia 

Madonna's Russian concerts were met with great controversy; when asked her stance on the arrest of feminist punk-rock band Pussy Riot, she responded: "I'm against censorship, and my whole career I've always promoted freedom of expression and freedom of speech so I think what's happening to them is unfair. And I hope that they don't have to serve 7 years in jail [...] I think art should be political, that art, historically speaking, always reflects what's going on socially". During the concert in Moscow, the singer donned the trademark balaclava worn by the members of the band and stripped down to a black bra, revealing the band's name written across her back. Afterward, other artists followed Madonna's steps and expressed support for the band, among them Paul McCartney and Peter Gabriel. Pussy Riot themselves tweeted: "DEAR MADONNA! We love you and you just might be changing Russia's history right now. Thank you and a thousand prayers in return!". Deputy Prime Minister Dmitry Rogozin, however, wrote an expletive-ridden Twitter post lambasting the singer for backing the band. On August 17, the members of Pussy Riot were found guilty of hooliganism and sentenced to two years in prison, to which Madonna posted on her website: "I protest the conviction and sentencing of Pussy Riot to a penal colony for two years for a 40 second performance extolling their political opinions [...] I call on all those who love freedom to condemn this unjust punishment. I urge artists around the world to speak up in protest against this travesty. [...] I call on ALL of Russia to let Pussy Riot go free".

The second date in Saint Petersburg was consequently met with terrorist threats, prompting the U.S. Embassy to issue a warning to those in attendance; Madonna's spokesperson Liz Rosenberg responded that the concert would go on as scheduled and that Russian authorities would step up security. On her official Facebook page, Madonna had previously posted that she planned to address Russia's so-called anti-gay law. Before the concert, attendees were given pink wristbands to show support for the LGBT community. During the show, the singer delivered a speech between the performances of "Open Your Heart" and "Masterpiece"; she praised democracy, love, and freedom and compared the LGBT community's struggles to Martin Luther King Jr.'s fights for equality. Russian gay rights organization Coming Out distributed rainbow posters and, at certain point, the troupe waved rainbow flags onstage. On August 17, it was announced that anti-gay Russian activists would sue Madonna for $10.4 million, arguing that she was promoting "homosexual propaganda", and had "insulted their feelings when she spoke out for gay rights" at the concert. According to one of the ten activists, "[Madonna] had been warned with words that she should behave in line with the law and she ignored it. So we will speak in the language of money"; another one felt that "after Madonna's concert maybe some boy becomes gay, some girl becomes lesbian, fewer children are born as a result and this big country cannot defend its borders". In November 2012, the claims were fully rejected; three years later, it was reported that Madonna had told Entertainment Weekly that she would most likely never visit Russia again because of its stands on gay rights. In July 2020, eight years after the incident, Madonna revealed that she was given a $1 million fine by the Russian government, which she never paid.

Broadcasts and recording 

On May 25, the Algemeiner Journal reported that Conan O'Brien would fly to Israel to host his late-night talk show as part of an exclusive deal to broadcast a special covering the tour's opening night. The aired segment featured comedian Billy Eichner asking passers-by from New York and Israel questions about Iran's nuclear crisis, the United Statess relations with Israel, and whether or not they were attending the concert. On October, a special segment aired on the Conan talk show; Eichner had the opportunity to meet the singer while she was rehearsing for her Yankee Stadium show in September. Shot in Rome, Inside The DNA of MDNA was a 7-minute behind the scenes video posted on Madonna's official YouTube channel on July 9, 2012. The July 26 concert at Paris L'Olympia was streamed live through LoveLive's YouTube channel.

On November 9, 2012, Madonna confirmed that the tour's official DVD would be shot at the 19—20 shows at Miami's American Airlines Arena; initially, she wanted to film the shows in Colombia, but due to conflicts with the directors' schedule, those shows were not filmed. Directed by Danny B. Tull and Stephane Sennour, Madonna: The MDNA Tour had a special world premiere screening on June 18 at New York's Paris Theater, with Madonna herself attending the event; four days later, it aired through EPIX. MDNA World Tour was released on September 10, 2013, in all formats: double-disc live album, DVD, and Blu-ray. It received generally mixed reviews from critics, some praised the technicality and the visuals attached with the show, while others noted the absence of Madonna's hit songs; MDNA World Tour became the singer's sixth consecutive and tenth video to top Billboards Top Music Videos chart.

Set list 
Set list, samples and notes adapted per Madonna's official website, the notes and track listing of MDNA World Tour, and additional sources.

Act 1: Transgression
 "Virgin Mary" 
 "Girl Gone Wild" 
 "Revolver"
 "Gang Bang"
 "Papa Don't Preach"
"Hung Up" 
 "I Don't Give A"
 "Best Friend" / "Heartbeat" 
Act 2: Prophecy
"Express Yourself" 
 "Give Me All Your Luvin'" 
 "Radio Dial Static Medley" 
 "Turn Up the Radio"
 "Open Your Heart" / "Sagarra Jo!"
 "Masterpiece"
Act 3: Masculine/Feminine
"Justify My Love" 
 "Vogue"
 "Candy Shop" 
 "Human Nature"
 "Like a Virgin" 
Act 4: Redemption
"Nobody Knows Me" 
 "I'm Addicted"
 "I'm a Sinner" 
 "Like a Prayer" 
 "Celebration"

Shows

Cancelled dates

Notes

Personnel 
Adapted from The MDNA Tour program.

Band 
Madonna –  creator, vocals, guitar
Kiley Dean – vocals
Nicki Richards – vocals
Kevin Antunes – musical director, keyboards, programmer
Brian Frasier-Moore – drums
Ric'key Pageot – piano, keyboards
Monte Pittman – guitar
Jason Yang – violin
Sean Spuehler – vocal mixing engineer

Dancers 
Adrien Galo – dancer
Ali "Lilou" Ramdani – dancer
Brahim Zaibat – dancer
Chaz Buzan – dancer
Derrell Bullock – dancer
Drew Dollaz – dancer
Emilie Capel – dancer
Emilie Schram – dancer
Habby "Hobgoblin" Jacques – dancer
Kupono Aweau – dancer
Charles "Lil Buck" Riley – dancer
Loic "Speedylegz" Mabanza – dancer
Lourdes "Lola" Leon – dancer
Marion Molin – dancer
Marvin Gofin – dancer
Rocco Ritchie – dancer
Sasha Mallery – dancer
Sheik Mondesir – dancer
Stephanie Nguyen – dancer
Valeree Pohl – dancer
Vibez Henderson – dancer
Yaman "Yamsonite" Okur – dancer
Hayden Nickell – slackliner
Jaan Roose – slackliner

Choreographers 
Alison Faulk – supervising choreographer
Jason Young – supervising choreographer
Megan Lawson – choreographer
Derrell Bullock – choreographer
Marvin & Marion – choreographers
Swoop & Goofy – choreopgraphers
Ali "Lilou" Ramdani – choreographer
Kalakan Trio – choreographers
Leesa Csolak – baton coach
Damon Grant – drum coach
Josh Greenwood – slackline coach, Shaolin master

Wardrobe 
Arianne Phillips – designer
Jean Paul Gaultier – designer
Alexander Wang – designer
Jeremy Scott – designer
Linda Matthews – costume supervisor
Laura Morgan – assistant costume designer
Terry Anderson – assistant costume designer
Molly Rebuschatis – assistant to Arianne Phillips
Phil Boutte – illustrator
Natasha Paczkowski – cutter fitter
Crystal Thompson – cutter fitter
Graeme Kalbe – shopper
Kareem James – shopper
Jocelyn Goldstein – shopper
Nicki Moody – shopper
Marley Glassroth – shopper
Seana Gordon – shopper
Brianna Patterson – costume coordinator
Willie Leon – costume production assistant
Alexis Hilferte Forte – costume production assistant

Participating designers 
Truth or Dare Intimates & Footwear
Miu Miu
Prada
Brooks Brothers
Adidas
Y-3
Dolce & Gabbana
Dsquared2

Show 
Jamie King – creative director
Tiffany Olson – creative director assistant
Michel Laprise – show director
Richmond Talauega – co-director
Anthony Talauega – co-director
Mark Fisher – show architect

Crew 
Tony Villaneuva – Madonna's dresser
Lana Czajka – head wardrobe
Lisa Nishimura – wardrobe
Renee Sola – wardrobe
Julie Sola – wardrobe
Pam Lewis – wardrobe
Krystie Rodriguez – wardrobe
Deb Cooper – wardrobe

Staff 
Tres Thomas – tour director
Frankie Enfield – artist tour manager
Jason Milner – tour manager
Cynthia Oknaian – ticketing manager
Jill McCutchan – assistant tour manager
Gingi Levin – assistant artist tour manager
Rafael Pagan – tour management assistant
Andy LeCompte – key hair stylist for Madonna
Gina Brooke – key make-up artist for Madonna
Jean-Michel Ete – kinesitherapeute
Courtney Rousso – hotel advance
Jerry Meltzer – security
Didier Meert – security
Huge Rodriguez – family security
Marco Pernini – artist chef
Mayumi Niimi – artist chef
Michelle Peck – aesthetician, masseuse
Nicole Winhoffer – personal trainer
Suzanne Lynch – physical therapist
Abel Meza – artist driver

See also 
 List of highest-grossing concert tours

References

Bibliography

External links 

Madonna.com > Tours > The MDNA Tour

2012 concert tours
LGBT-related controversies in music
Madonna concert tours